Hillieae is a tribe of flowering plants in the family Rubiaceae and contains about 29 species in 3 genera. Its representatives are found in tropical America. The tribe is sometimes included in its sister tribe Hamelieae.

Genera 
Currently accepted names

 Balmea Martinez (1 sp)
 Cosmibuena Ruiz & Pav. (4 sp)
 Hillia Jacq. (24 sp)

Synonyms

 Buena Pohl = Cosmibuena
 Fereiria Vell. ex Vand. = Hillia
 Ravnia Oerst. = Hillia
 Saldanha Vell. = Hillia

References 

 
Cinchonoideae tribes